Guihomar III of Léon (c. 1087–1157) was a Viscount of Léon. He succeeded his father Harvey I.

Life 
Very few things are known about Guihomar III’s life.

His name appears firstly in the charter of foundation of the priory Saint-Martin of Morlaix made by his father in 1128.

He is also cited in the charter of the foundation of the priory of Saint-Melaine of Morlaix (c. 1145-1147) made by his son Harvey II, who mentions “pater meus G. vicecomes”.

Issue 
The name of Guihomar’s wife is not known. They had two sons :
 Harvey II who succeeded his father and married Sybilla, an illegitimate daughter of King Stephen.
 Guihomar, mentioned in 1164 with his son Josselin Léa Chaillou, believes that this is a misreading of the charter and that Josselin was not related to the de Léon family.

References

Sources 
Chaillou, Léa. The House of Léon: Genealogy and Origins. Foundations: The Journal of the Foundation for Medieval Genealogy, volume 11, 2019, pp. 19–48 
 Patrick Kernévez, André-Yves Bourgès Généalogie des vicomtes de Léon (XIe, XIIe et XIIIe siècles). Bulletin de la Société archéologique du Finistère, volume CXXXVI, 2007, p. 157-188.  

Viscounts of Léon
House of Léon
11th-century Breton people
12th-century Breton people